Wolterstorff (a Toponymic surname, derived from German Waltersdorf = Walter's village) is the family name of 

 Nicholas Wolterstorff (* 1932), American philosopher
 Robert M. Wolterstorff (1914 – 2007), American Bishop
 Willy Wolterstorff (1864 – 1943), German paleontologist and herpetologist